Sherry Wilson is a Canadian provincial politician, who is a member of the Legislative Assembly of New Brunswick. She was first elected to the legislature in 2010.

Early life
Wilson grew up on a dairy farm in Intervale, New Brunswick and attended schools in Petitcodiac. She is one of nine children. Following high school, she completed a business and secretarial course at Campbellton Community College.

Before politics
After college she began working at Hub Meat Packers in Moncton where she was Credit Manager Assistant and after moving to Edmonton, Alberta, she worked at the University Hospital in administration. She returned to Riverview and bought her own business in 1984, which she has owned for 26 years.

Wilson also volunteered for the RCMP from 1991 to 1999 as Victim Services Coordinator. In 2002 and 2003, she was the president of the Downtown Riverview Business Association and in 2004 she was elected to Riverview Town Council and was re-elected in 2008. She sat on the Codiac Regional Policing Authority Board, D.A.R.E., Tri Community Council Liaison, Immigration Board, and served as deputy mayor in 2005.

Political career
Wilson ran for a seat to the New Brunswick Legislature in the 2010 provincial election. She stood as a Progressive Conservative candidate in the electoral district of Petitcodiac. 
She defeated former cabinet minister and floor crosser Wally Stiles to take back the seat for her party.

Wilson was re-elected to the 58th Legislative Assembly of New Brunswick September 22, 2014, to represent the riding of Moncton Southwest.

Since November 9, 2018, she has served as Minister of Service New Brunswick and Minister responsible for Women's Equality, in the Progressive Conservative government of Premier Blaine Higgs.

Wilson was re-elected in the 2018 and 2020 provincial elections.

References

Progressive Conservative Party of New Brunswick MLAs
Women government ministers of Canada
Women MLAs in New Brunswick
Living people
Members of the Executive Council of New Brunswick
21st-century Canadian politicians
21st-century Canadian women politicians
Year of birth missing (living people)